Oroligt blod ("Restless Blood" ) is a 1946 Swedish-language Finnish drama film directed by Teuvo Tulio and starring Regina Linnanheimo, Harriett Philipson and Hans Strååt. The film was shot in parallel with the Finnish-language version Levoton veri.

Cast
 Regina Linnanheimo as Karin Linde 
 Hans Strååt as Valter Linde 
 Harriett Philipson as Gunilla Dahl 
 Lilan Wasström as Elsa, Karin's and Gunilla's aunt
 Matti Nylund as Matte
 Ingrid Östergren as Lisa, the maid
 Nora Mäkinen as the street girl

References

External links 
 Oroligt blod on elonet.finna.fi

1946 films
1946 drama films
Finnish drama films
Swedish-language films from Finland
Films based on works by Aleksandr Pushkin
Films directed by Teuvo Tulio
Finnish black-and-white films